The Union for the Republic (UPR) was a centrist, Christian-democratic political party in San Marino. The party was formed on 4 March 2011 by a merger of the Centre Democrats (DdC) and Euro-Populars for San Marino (EPS).

During the Sammarinese election of 2012 the party ran as part of the losing Agreement for the Country alliance, obtaining 5 seats.

The party formed a coalition with the Popular Alliance for the Sammarinese election of 2016 and following their electoral success, the two parties created a new party, Future Republic.

References

External links
Official website

2011 establishments in San Marino
2017 disestablishments in San Marino
Centrist parties in Europe
Christian democratic parties in Europe
Defunct political parties in San Marino
Political parties disestablished in 2017
Political parties established in 2011
Pro-European political parties in San Marino